Sporsmaal2, pronounced Sporsmaal two is a UK electronic music artist whose genre he describes as melodic breakspaz’n bass electronica but we can also describe it as electronica, drum'n'bass, breakcore or as music for films.
He is also the inventor of the ‘String Machene’ a unique hand-crafted musical instrument, a "drone" instrument. It has six tuneable strings with an electric motor for each one.
Sporsmaal2 is signed to the label Tegleg Records.

Biography
 Sporsmaal2, alias Mick Robinson is an artist who originally started playing music in 1989 as the guitarist for Timothy, an indie pop guitar band touring the UK who had a vinyl release. After the inevitable break-up of Timothy, he got together with the bass player Paul Betts and formed “the Universal 39 concept live at the synphonia bluegrass tribute concert”, an experimental studio based project.
 After that he played homemade electronics in Speedneedle, fronted by the legendary Mark Robinson (no relation).
 Disillusioned with popular forms of music, he craved a deeper understanding of sound art which led him to pursue higher education and gained a degree in phonic art at the University of Lincolnshire and Humberside in Hull. This opened up new doorways and new audiences for his music.
 During this course, he met Dan Cross, the founder of Tegleg Records (named after Mick's dog Integrity). Tegleg Records promotes musicians working in electronic, digital music and phonic, sonic art. During those three prolific years as a student he played as himself in many venues, art galleries, museums, clubs or pubs. He was privileged enough to take part in the first live Internet streaming event at Hull Time Based Arts, linking with New York City, US.
 He moved to Leeds and made music for short films. The most successful of which, “Moose” directed by the author Susan Everett, was short-listed for the BAFTA nominations in the  digital shorts category.
 When he went back to Hull and played a few gigs as himself, Sarah Johns (now Mr Beasley) proposed her vocal talent and they formed U39C, "a bloke with a computer and a girl with a microphone".
 After a year in Aberdeen, where he played as Sporsmaal2 for the first time at Dr Drakes, just before its doors closed forever, he took a break from live performance, and retreated into his studio, he developed new sounds and a new style. He also spent some time teaching himself programming and developed his own sound software such as the Blakboard Synth.
 Nowadays living in the north of France, he is heavily involved in Tegleg Records, working together with Dan Cross DXN and Keith Bianchi KeifyB. Their live event in August 2010 at The New Adelphi Club in Hull, was a mashup of twisted beats, warped soundscapes and humorous wordplay, with Tegleg's own brand of playful humour, and can be seen on YouTube.
 He also created the Android app, Tegtracker pro, in November 2011.

Albums
 Leg N Bass Collection (Dead Jackson version), 2009
 Monkey Feet, 2011

Compilation albums
 Sponic Mesh, Tegleg Records, 2003
 Sponic Mesh 2, Tegleg Records, 2008
 45 Drums, Breaks & Dubstep (unmixed tracks), Brazilian House Grooves, 2009
 Drums Breaks & Beats, Dark Gadgets Recordings, 2009

Remixes
 Remixes for Houston Bernard
 Remix for Tidy Kid
 Remix for Jake Hook
 Remix for How to Destroy Angels

See also
 List of independent UK record labels
 List of electronic music record labels

References

External links
 The official website of Sporsmaal2
 Myspace
 The official website of Tegleg Records

Alumni of the University of Lincoln
English electronic musicians
Living people
Year of birth missing (living people)